Wirtualna Polska (WP ) is a group of companies operating in the media and e-commerce sectors. The WP Group owns the Wirtualna Polska horizontal portal founded in 1995 and known for being the first internet portal in Poland. It is currently the second largest online news source and one of the most quoted news media in the country. According to the Gemius/PBI surveys around 21 million Poles use WP's internet products every month.

History 
Wirtualna Polska was created by Leszek Bogdanowicz, Damian Woźniak, Marek Borzestowski and Jacek Kawalec at Politechnika Gdańska in Gdańsk, who met each other via the Internet. The early forum of ideas turned in March 1995 into a service using the name Wirtualna Polska. Initially, it was available on www.wp.cnt.pl (CNT = Centrum Nowych Technologii, Centre of New Technologies). In 1998, it was moved to www.wp.pl, which is its current address. In the beginning, Wirtualna Polska functioned as a catalogue of websites and then was modified into a web portal offering a number of complex services. Many of the activities of the portal at the Internet market were cutting edge. Wirtualna Polska used XHTML and it was the first portal to create a catalogue of web sites with a possibility of positioning them. It also initiated personalization and online chats. Apart from a number of news services, WP provided access to such services as free email accounts, the possibility of web hosting, a web engine, and instant messaging service.

In February 2014 the Polish o2 Group („Grupa o2”) together with private equity fund Innova Capital have completed acquisition of Wirtualna Polska. The combined companies started to operate on the market under the one name “Wirtualna Polska”. The purchase of 100 per cent of the Wirtualna Polska shares from subsidiary of Orange Polska SA (formerly TP SA) by the Polish o2 Group completed the formal process of forming the new Wirtualna Polska Group. Transactions have been approved by the Office of Competition and Consumer Protection.

In 2016 Innova Capital, the leading CEE private equity fund, sold its 27% stake in Wirtualna Polska Holding SA for PLN 50.00 per share. Jacek Świderski, Michał Brański and Krzysztof Sierota, entrepreneurs with a majority stake in Wirtualna Polska, were involved in the repurchase of shares from Innova Capital. All remaining shares were sold to public institutional investors in the accelerated book building (ABB) process.

Services 
WP operates various specialized websites and e-commerce websites like AutoCentrum.pl S.A., Nocowanie.pl and Domodi.pl.

In 2016, WP launched a television channel.

References

Companies established in 1995
Web portals
Polish news websites
1995 establishments in Poland
Companies based in Gdańsk